Edy Baumann (12 July 1914 – 27 November 1993) was a Swiss cyclist. He competed in the 1000m time trial event at the 1936 Summer Olympics.

References

External links
 

1914 births
1993 deaths
Swiss male cyclists
Olympic cyclists of Switzerland
Cyclists at the 1936 Summer Olympics
Place of birth missing